The National Dance Awards 2004, were organised and presented by The Critics' Circle, and were awarded to recognise excellence in professional dance in the United Kingdom.  The ceremony was held at the Royal Opera House, London, on 20 January 2005, with awards given for productions staged in the previous year.

Awards Presented
 De Valois Award for Outstanding Achievement in Dance - Sir Peter Wright, Director Laureate of Birmingham Royal Ballet
 Best Male Dancer - Jonathan Cope, of The Royal Ballet
 Best Female Dancer - Leanne Benjamin, of The Royal Ballet
 Working Title Billy Elliot Prize - Taylor Davies
 Audience Award - Northern Ballet Theatre
 Sunday Express Children's Award - Abbie Hastings
 Dance UK Industry Award - Dick Matchett
 Best Choreography (Classical) - Christopher Wheeldon, for Rush for San Francisco Ballet
 Best Choreography (Modern) - Javier de Frutos, for Elsa Canasta for Rambert Dance Company and Milagrosfor Royal New Zealand Ballet
 Best Choreography (Musical Theatre) - Matthew Bourne for Play Without Words at the Royal National Theatre
 Outstanding Female Artist (Modern) - Amy Hollingsworth, of Rambert Dance Company
 Outstanding Male Artist (Modern) - Paul Liburd, of Rambert Dance Company
 Outstanding Female Artist (Classical) - Lauren Cuthbertson, of The Royal Ballet
 Outstanding Male Artist (Classical) - Thiago Soares, of The Royal Ballet
 Company Prize for Outstanding Repertoire (Classical) - The Royal Ballet
 Company Prize for Outstanding Repertoire (Modern) - Rambert Dance Company
 Best Foreign Dance Company - Merce Cunningham Dance Company from United States of America

Special awards
No special awards were presented for the 2004 season.

References

National Dance Awards
Dance
Dance